IEEE W.R.G. Baker Award provided by the Institute of Radio Engineers (IRE), was created in 1956 from a donation from Walter R. G. Baker (1892–1960) to the IRE. The award continued to be awarded by the board of directors of the Institute of Electrical and Electronics Engineers (IEEE), after the IRE organization merged into the IEEE in 1963. Recipients received a certificate and honorarium "for the most outstanding paper reporting original work" in one of the IEEE publications, including the transactions, journals, proceedings, and magazines of the IEEE Societies. The award was discontinued in 2016.

Recipients
The following people received the IEEE W.R.G. Baker Award:

References 

W.R.G. Baker Award
Awards established in 1956
1956 establishments in the United States
Awards disestablished in 2016